The Women's road race of the 2020 UCI Road World Championships was a cycling event that took place on 26 September 2020 in Imola, Italy. Annemiek van Vleuten was the defending champion.

Anna van der Breggen from the Netherlands became the first rider in 25 years to win both the road race and time trial titles at a single World Championships, after a  solo attack. She finished 80 seconds clear of her closest competitors, to win her second world title in three years. The silver medal went to compatriot van Vleuten, who was riding the race with a brace on a fractured wrist – having completed a U-turn on competing in the race – following a crash the week prior at the Giro Rosa. The bronze medal was taken by Italy's Elisa Longo Borghini, losing out to van Vleuten in a two-up sprint.

The race took place on a  course, starting and finishing at the Autodromo Internazionale Enzo e Dino Ferrari (a motor racing circuit). Heading out from the Autodromo into the Emilia-Romagna countryside, the course used two climbs with an average gradient of 10% separated by the town of Riolo Terme, before returning to the Autodromo.

Qualification

Participating nations
Following the withdrawals of Chloé Dygert and Rotem Gafinovitz after the time trial two days prior to the race, 143 cyclists from 41 nations were listed to start the -long course. Three further riders did not start the race. The number of cyclists per nation is shown in parentheses.

Final classification

References

External links

Women's road race
UCI Road World Championships – Women's road race
2020 in women's road cycling